Cayuta Creek (Kay-YOO-tuh) is a tributary of the Susquehanna River that flows through Schuyler, Chemung and Tioga counties in New York state, and Bradford County, Pennsylvania.

The creek flows from the lake in a southeasterly direction, roughly parallel to New York State Route 224, past Alpine Junction and the hamlet of Cayuta. It then crosses into Chemung County and flows through the village of Van Etten.

At Van Etten, the creek turns southward and runs through the western edge of Tioga County. It flows through Lockwood and Reniff in the town of Barton, and through the eastern part of the village of Waverly, where it passes beneath the Southern Tier Expressway.

Immediately south of the highway, the creek crosses into Pennsylvania in the borough of Sayre. It then flows southeastward through the borough's Milltown section before emptying into the Susquehanna.

There is a  hiking trail through the gorge near Alpine. The trail is particularly beautiful in summer and fall and is an easy hike with slight rises and falls, according to the Schuyler County Chamber of Commerce.

See also
List of New York rivers
List of rivers of Pennsylvania

References

Rivers of New York (state)
Rivers of Pennsylvania
Tributaries of the Susquehanna River
Rivers of Bradford County, Pennsylvania
Rivers of Schuyler County, New York
Rivers of Chemung County, New York
Rivers of Tioga County, New York